Roger Levecq (born 24 August 1935) is a French weightlifter. He competed in the men's heavyweight event at the 1968 Summer Olympics.

References

1935 births
Living people
French male weightlifters
Olympic weightlifters of France
Weightlifters at the 1968 Summer Olympics
Sportspeople from Nord (French department)